The 17th Street Bridge (officially named the Alma Lee Loy Bridge in 2012) is a fixed concrete bridge that spans the Indian River intracoastal waterway in Indian River County, Florida.  The bridge, started in 1977, was constructed by Gulf Contracting Inc, FL and was completed in 1979.

The Florida Department of Transportation bridge number is 880077.

The bridge has a total of four motor vehicle lanes and two bicycle lanes.

On the river it crosses the ICW at Statute Mile 953, south of flashing day beacon #145A.

In 2018, the bridge was found to be in critical condition, needing prompt repair. It was assessed to be structurally deficient in May 2020 according to Florida Department of Transportation inspection reports. A major overhaul is planned in 2024.

Controversy 
Citizens are petitioning the government to add concrete barriers to protect the bicycle lanes after a child was killed crossing the bridge.
The Florida DOT insists the 38 foot width each direction is too narrow for two travel lanes and a protected bicycle lane.

References

External links 

Indian River County Historical Timeline

Road bridges in Florida
Bridges completed in 1979
Concrete bridges in Florida
Buildings and structures in Vero Beach, Florida
Transportation buildings and structures in Indian River County, Florida
Indian River Lagoon
Bridges over the Indian River (Florida)
1979 establishments in Florida
Transportation in Vero Beach, Florida